"Thankyou Whoever You Are" and "Most Toys" are songs recorded by British neo-progressive rock band Marillion which appeared on their 14th studio album, Somewhere Else. They were released on a double A-side single in the United Kingdom and in the Netherlands in June 2007. "Thankyou" is a slow, slightly orchestral ballad arranged in the band's trademark style. In stark contrast, "Most Toys" is simple, rocky and fast, with an anti-consumerism message. It has a running time of 2:49, one of the band's shortest recordings to date, along with the musically similar "Hooks in You" from 1989).

To maximize the purchase incentive for fans and spur potential chart success, the single came in three physical formats (including a PAL-only DVD) featuring different exclusive tracks each (including two non-album tracks), with the second A-side "Most Toys" only being available on two of them. In addition, live versions of both tracks were included in an iTunes download.

The single spent one week in the UK Singles Chart, reaching number 15 on 23 June 2007. This makes it the band's second biggest success in the two decades since the release of "Incommunicado" (1987) in terms of peak position. On the Dutch singles charts, the release was more successful, running three weeks and peaking at Number 6. In terms of peak position, this made it the band's biggest hit ever in that country, as even their otherwise most popular hits from the 1980s, such as "Kayleigh", "Lavender", and "Incommunicado", had not made the top ten there.

The DVD format contains an audio version of the Britney Spears dance-pop hit "Toxic" recorded live on an evening of cover versions during a 2007 fanclub convention in the Center Parcs holiday resort of Port Zelande, Ouddorp, Netherlands, in early February 2007.

In total, "Thankyou Whoever You Are" marks Marillion's 35th and, as of 2013, last physical or digital single containing original material. For the three studio albums released since then, individual tracks have been used for promotional purposes (YouTube, radio airplay) but have not been made available for purchase.

Track list

Two-track CD single
 "Thankyou Whoever You Are" (Edit) — 4:06 original version from Somewhere Else
 "Say The Word" — 5:14 non-album track

Four-track CD single
 "Thankyou Whoever You Are" (Edit) — 4:06 
 "Most Toys" — 2:49 from Somewhere Else
 "Circular Ride" — 3:54 non-album track
 "The Wound (Live)" — 7:14 original version from Somewhere Else

DVD single
 "Thankyou Whoever You Are" (Edit) — 4:06
 "Most Toys" — 2:49 
 "Toxic" (Live) — 4:49 
 "Thankyou Whoever You Are" (Live Video) — 4:57 
 "Most Toys" (Live Video) — 2:57

iTunes download
 "Thankyou Whoever You Are" (Live)
 "Most Toys" (Live)

All tracks written by Marillion (Hogarth, Kelly, Rothery, Trewavas, Mosley), except "Toxic", written by Cathy Dennis, Henrik Jonback, Christian Karlsson, Pontus Winnberg.

External links
2007 discography on Marillion.com
Live video for "Thankyou Whoever You Are" on Marillion's official YouTube channel
Live video for "Most Toys" on Marillion's official YouTube channel

Personnel
 Steve Hogarth – vocals
 Mark Kelly – keyboards
 Ian Mosley – drums
 Steve Rothery – guitar
 Pete Trewavas – bass guitar
 Gary Good - saxophone
 Dave Littlejohn - trombone

Chart positions

References

Marillion songs
2007 singles
2007 songs
Songs written by Steve Hogarth
Songs written by Steve Rothery
Songs written by Mark Kelly (keyboardist)
Songs written by Pete Trewavas
Songs written by Ian Mosley